Jollibee Foods Corporation (abbreviated as JFC and Jollibee Group; also known as Jollibee after its primary fast food brand) is a Philippine multinational company based in Pasig, Philippines. JFC is the owner of the fast food brand Jollibee.

With the success of its flagship brand, JFC acquired some of its competitors in the fast food business in the Philippines and abroad such as Chowking, Greenwich Pizza, Red Ribbon, and Mang Inasal. As of September 2022, JFC operates more than 6,300 stores worldwide, with system-wide retail sales totaling .

Background

In 1975, Tony Tan Caktiong and his family opened a Magnolia Ice Cream parlor in Cubao, Quezon City which is credited as the first Jollibee outlet. The Magnolia outlets operated by the Tan Caktiong clan began offering hot meals and sandwiches upon request from the customers which the family found out to be more popular than the franchise's ice cream. In 1978, the family decided to cancel the Magnolia franchise and converted the ice cream parlors they operated into fast food outlets. Management consultant Manuel C. Lumba advised the family of the move.

The Jollibee Foods Corporation was incorporated in January 1978. It opened its first store overseas in Taiwan which later closed.

Jollibee experienced rapid growth. It was able to withstand the entry of McDonald's in the Philippines in 1981 by focusing on the specific tastes of the Filipino market, which differed from the American fast food company. On July 13, 1993, JFC was listed at the Philippine Stock Exchange.

In 2011, JFC opened 260 new stores, of which 167 were in the Philippines led by Mang Inasal (86) and Jollibee (40). This brought the company's total number of stores to 2,001 as of the end of December 2011. The same year, Jollibee closed Manong Pepe foodchain in favor of Mang Inasal, and sold Délifrance to CaféFrance. Overseas, Jollibee opened 93 stores, led by Yonghe King in China (70) and Jollibee Vietnam (11).

Acquisition history

Philippine brands

The company acquired 80% of Greenwich Pizza in 1994. From a 50-branch operation, Greenwich gradually established a strong presence in the food service industry. In 2000, the company acquired Chowking, a Chinese fast food restaurant, thus making Jollibee a part of the Asian quick service restaurant segment. In 2005, Jollibee acquired Red Ribbon, a bakeshop business in the Philippines.

JFC subsidiary Fresh N' Famous Foods, Inc. manages the Greenwhich and Chowking brands. The Red Ribbon brand is under Red Ribbon Bakeshop Inc. which in turn is managed by a holding company of the JFC, RRB Holdings, Inc. The firm has also stakes on Burger King's outlets in the Philippines through Perf Restaurants, Inc. which is 54 percent owned by JFC as of 2012.

Foreign brands

Jollibee Foods Corporation has stakes in restaurant chains based or originating outside the Philippines such as in Mainland China, Taiwan, Canada, and United States as well as the holder of the master franchise of Burger King in the Philippines.

In China and Taiwan
In 2004, Jollibee acquired Chinese fast food chain Yonghe Dawang for $22.5 million. Jollibee entered into a joint-venture contract with US-based Chow Fun Holdings LLC, the developer and owner of Jinja Bar Bistro in New Mexico, in which Jollibee acquired a 12% stake for $950,000. In 2006, Jollibee purchased 70% of Shanghai-based restaurant Lao Dong in June and Taichung-based Chun Shui Tang tea house. In 2007, Jollibee acquired the Chinese fast-food chain Hongzhuangyuan for $50.5 million (roughly ₱2 billion) but divested its shares from Lao Dong and Chun Shui Tang, only a year after it purchase stakes in the two food chains.

Ltd. The sale is subject to the approval of the China's Ministry of Commerce. In October 2010, Jollibee signed a deal to acquire 55 percent of China's Guangxi San Ping Wang Food and Beverage Management Co. Ltd., operators of the San Pin Wang beef noodle business for 30 million RMB.

Its restaurants in mainland China are responsible for about 12% of the company's total sales, mostly through chains it acquired.

The Yonghe King, Hong Zhuang Yuan & San Pin Wang chains are under JFC's SuperFoods Group.
In May 2018, Jollibee Food Corporation announced that it has acquired the master franchise of Tim Ho Wan, a Michelin-star dim sum restaurant chain in Asia Pacific, for SG$45 million from its private equity fund investment Titan Dining Partners Limited. Tim Ho Wan Private holds the exclusive long-term master franchise to run Tim Ho Wan within the Asia Pacific region, excluding ones in Hong Kong. Dim Sum Private, on the other hand, owns and operates Tim Ho Wan chains in Singapore.

In the United States
In October 2015, Jollibee announced that it has acquired a 40-percent stake in Smashburger in a deal that values the American fast-casual burger chain at $335 million. In December 2018 Jollibee acquired 100 percent of the shares in Smashburger, gaining a full control of the American hamburger chain.

On September 7, 2018, Jollibee Foods Corporation announced its acquisition of 47% stake in US-based Mexican food restaurant, Tortas Frontera of Rick Bayless for $12.4 million.

On July 24, 2019, Jollibee Foods Corporation purchased The Coffee Bean & Tea Leaf for $350 million.

Foreign brands in the Philippines

In October 2011, Jollibee acquired a 54% stake in BK Titans, Inc., the sole franchisee of Burger King in the Philippines.

On September 27, 2018, JFC announced its 50-50 joint venture with Chinese-American restaurant chain, Panda Express to bring its stores to the Philippines. On July 8, 2019, both JFC and Panda Express' parent company, Panda Restaurant Group formed their joint venture company, JBPX Foods, Inc. after its incorporation by Securities and Exchange Commission.

In September 2017, it was reported that JFC is considering to bid for the acquisition of British sandwich multinational chain Pret a Manger for at least $1 billion. But it was acquired instead by JAB Holding Company, in 2018.

On February 16, 2021, JFC announced that it has entered a joint venture with Yoshinoya International Philippines (which is a unit subsidiary of Asia Yoshinoya International SDN BHD and Yoshinoya Holdings Co. Ltd.) to establish a company that would serve as the franchisee of Yoshinoya in the country after Century Pacific Food's franchise deal with the Japanese fast food chain ended. Under the new deal, there are plans to open 50 stores in the country in the long-term. The company, which is named Yoshinoya Jollibee Foods, Inc. was incorporated on June 22, 2021.

Brands
 Jollibee - Filipino-style fast food restaurant with American-influenced dishes specializing in burgers, spaghetti, chicken and some local Filipino dishes.
 Greenwich - The fast food restaurant features a variety of Italian main and side dishes specializing in pizzas and pastas.
 Red Ribbon - The bakeshop offers a wide array of baked goods specializing in cakes.
 Chowking (超群) - The fast food serve Chinese food menu predominantly selling noodle soups, dim sum and rice bowls with toppings.
 Mang Inasal - Barbecue fast food restaurant chain.
 Burger King Philippines - JFC is managing the operations of the American hamburger fast food chain in the Philippines.
 Highlands Coffee - top café chain in Vietnam 
 Smashburger - American fast-casual hamburger restaurant chain.
 Yonghe King (永和大王) - Chinese fast-food restaurant that specializes in noodles.
 Hongzhuangyuan (宏状元) - Chinese fast food chain.
 Tortas Frontera - US-based Mexican food restaurant by chef Rick Bayless, owns 47% stake.
 Panda Express Philippines - Joint venture with a Chinese-American fast food restaurant's parent company, Panda Restaurant Group through JBPX Foods, Inc. and operates its Philippine chain, owns 50% stake.
 PHO24 - Vietnamese style restaurant chain specializing in Pho that is owned by Jolibee subsidiary Superfoods Group and operates in  Macau, Hong Kong, Vietnam, the Philippines and Indonesia.
 The Coffee Bean & Tea Leaf - American coffee chain founded in 1963, purchased by JFC in 2019.
 Yoshinoya Philippines (𠮷野家／よしのや) - Joint venture with a Japanese fast food chain, Yoshinoya through Yoshinoya Jollibee Foods, Inc. and operates its Philippine chain, owns 50% stake.
 Tim Ho Wan Asia-Pacific (添好運) - JFC holds 85% stake in the Michelin-star restaurant.
 Milksha (迷客夏) - Jollibee Group acquired 51% of Milkshop International, operator of Taiwanese milk tea chain Milksha, in 2021. Milksha is regarded as Taiwan's “best milk tea” brand.

Former brands
Jollibee Foods Corporation jointly opened a branch of Délifrance with master franchisee Delifrance Asia Ltd. The JFC became the sole franchise of the bakery chain in the Philippines in 2006 through its subsidiary Fresh N' Famous Foods. The franchise agreement between JFC and Delifrance Asia ended on December 31, 2011, and assets of Délifrance in the Philippines was sold to CafeFrance Corp. CafeFrance Corp. intended to use all of the bought assets as its initial capital for a cafe chain under the a new brand name.

The company also managed Manong Pepe, a food chain patterned after the carinderia until 2011. Initially named Tio Pepe's Karinderia, the now defunct chain was meant to cater to people from the lower classes, particularly those from the socioeconomic class D demographic. JFC discontinued the Manong Pepe business on April 9, 2011.

In Greater China, Jollibee Group formerly owned stakes of Shanghai-based Lao Dong (老董牛肉麵) and Taichung-based Chun Shui Tang (春水堂) until 2007. In 2022, the company also announced that its subsidiary terminated the master franchise agreement for Dunkin' Donuts,  which covers mainland China, Hong Kong, and Macau.

Joint ventures
Jollibee Foods Corporation and the Viet Thai International Joint Stock Company formed a joint venture named Superfoods Group, which owns and managed the Vietnamese coffee chain brand, Highlands Coffee. In November 2016, the two companies agreed to list Superfoods as a public company in a stock exchange by July 2019.

In October 2016, Jollibee and Cargill formed a joint venture, C-Joy Poultry Meats Production, and broke ground on a new poultry processing facility at Santo Tomas, Batangas in the Philippines. The facility will be expected to process 45 million chickens per year.

Labor policy
According to the Department of Labor and Employment (DOLE) in May 2018, the Jollibee Foods Corporation has the most workers who are employed under a labor-only contracting (LOC) program.

Infringement in China 
JoyRulBee reportedly used a very similar branding to Jollibee, including the usage of Jollibee mascot as part of its logo. JFC issued a statement that it is taking action to protect its trademark rights.

Notes

References

External links
 

 
Multinational food companies
Multinational companies headquartered in the Philippines
Companies listed on the Philippine Stock Exchange
1978 establishments in the Philippines
Companies based in Pasig
Philippine brands